Daniel Angelus Driscoll (March 6, 1875 – June 5, 1955) was an American businessman and politician who served four terms as a U.S. Representative from New York from 1909 to 1917.

Biography 
Born in Buffalo, New York, Driscoll attended the public schools and Central High School.
He engaged in the undertaking business with his father Timothy Driscoll, and also in other business enterprises.

Congress 
Driscoll was elected as a Democrat to the Sixty-first and to the three succeeding Congresses (March 4, 1909 – March 3, 1917).
He was an unsuccessful candidate for reelection in 1916 to the Sixty-fifth Congress.

Career after Congress 
He resumed the undertaking business in Buffalo, New York.
He served as postmaster of Buffalo from February 15, 1934, until February 28, 1947.
He served as president of the Phoenix Brewery Corp. of Buffalo, New York.

Death 
He died in Buffalo, New York, June 5, 1955.
He was interred in Holy Cross Cemetery, Lackawanna, New York.

References

1875 births
1955 deaths
Democratic Party members of the United States House of Representatives from New York (state)
American funeral directors
Politicians from Buffalo, New York
New York (state) postmasters
Burials in New York (state)